Barmen is a former industrial metropolis of the region of Bergisches Land, Germany, which merged with four other towns in 1929 to form the city of Wuppertal. 

Barmen, together with the neighbouring town of Elberfeld founded the first electric suspended monorail tramway system, the Schwebebahn floating tram.

History
Barmen was a pioneering centre for both the early industrial revolution on the European mainland, and for the socialist movement and its theory. It was the location of one of the first concentration camps in Nazi Germany, KZ Wuppertal-Barmen, later better known as Kemna concentration camp.

Oberbarmen (Upper Barmen) is the eastern part of Barmen, and Unterbarmen (Lower Barmen) the western part.

One of its claims to fame is the fact that Friedrich Engels, co-author of The Communist Manifesto, was born in Barmen. Another of its claims is the fact that Bayer AG was founded there by Friedrich Bayer and master dyer Johann Friedrich Weskott with the express purpose to erect and operate a dyeworks.

Legacy
The asteroid 118173 Barmen is named in its honour, celebrating the 1934 Synod which issued the Barmen Declaration defining Protestant opposition to National-Socialist ideology.

Personalities
 Friedrich Engels (1820–1895), Marxist philosopher
 Julius Kemna (1837-1898), entrepreneur and company founder
 Hermann Ebbinghaus (1850–1909), psychologist
 Julius Richard Petri (1852-1921), microbiologist
 Wilhelm Dörpfeld (1853–1940), architect and archaeologist
 Carl Duisberg (1861-1935), chemist and industrialist
 Ferdinand Sauerbruch (1875-1951), surgeon
 Adeline Rittershaus (1876–1924), philologist and champion for the equality of women
 Johann Viktor Bredt (1879-1940), jurist and politician 
 Else Brökelschen (1879-1976), politician (CDU)
 Max Bockmühl (1882–1949), chemist
 Rudolf Carnap (1891–1970), member of the Vienna Circle of positivists
 Wilhelm Philipps (1894-1971), generalleutnant
 Robert Tillmanns (1896-1955), politician (CDU)
 Martin Blank (1897-1972), politician (FDP)
 Friedrich-Wilhelm Müller (1897–1947), "The Butcher of Crete"
 Walter Julius Bloem (1898–1945), author and recipient of the Iron Cross
 Liselotte Schaak (1908-undated), actress
 Bernd Klug (1914-1975), admiral
 Kurt Brand (1917-1991), science-fiction author
 Reimar Lüst (1923–2020), astrophysicist
 Siegfried Palm (1927-2005), pianist

Population

See also
SSV Barmen

References

Wuppertal
Former municipalities in North Rhine-Westphalia
Friedrich Engels